The DCU Saints may refer to:

 DCU Saints (American football)
 DCU Saints (basketball)